Rickety Rocket is an animated television series, produced by Ruby-Spears Productions, which ran from 1979 to 1980 as a segment on The Plastic Man Comedy/Adventure Show.

Plot
In the far future, four African-American teenagers named Sunstroke (voiced by John Anthony Bailey), Splashdown (voiced by Johnny Brown), Cosmo (voiced by Bobby F. Ellerby), and Venus (voiced by Dee Timberlake) build a makeshift sentient, talking rocket (voiced by Al Fann). They run the Far Out Detective Agency and solve mysteries that usually has them fighting suspects operating as master criminals or disguised as monsters. The rocket's signature phrase was "Rickety Rocket, blaaaaaaasssssst offffffffffffff!"

Episodes

References

External links
 Episode list at Online Video Guide
 Toonarific
 Episode list at The Big Cartoon Database

American children's animated fantasy television series
American children's animated mystery television series
1970s American animated television series
1970s American black cartoons
1980s American animated television series
1980s American black cartoons
1979 American television series debuts
1980 American television series endings
Television series by Ruby-Spears
Ruby-Spears superheroes
Teen animated television series